Kochadaiiyaan (The king with long, curly mane) is the soundtrack album composed by A. R. Rahman to the 3D motion capture computer-animated Tamil film of the same name directed by Soundarya R. Ashwin. The original version as well as the dubbed Telugu version of the soundtrack (titled Vikramasimha) was released on 9 March 2014. The Hindi version was released online on Eros Now on 13 March 2014. Upon its release, the soundtrack became the first Tamil film music album to trend on Twitter and top the iTunes India charts.

Development
Initially, A. R. Rahman dithered to compose the soundtrack album as he was well aware of the time taken for the completion of performance capture films. Later, he agreed to compose after being convinced by the director that the filming would be done in a year. On completion of the score, in an interview with Deccan Chronicle he quoted, "Working for a performance capture film was a little difficult and composing the background scores and songs for it was a tedious process. We brought in about 150 orchestras and made every song unique."

Reported as "Ethirgal Illai" in 2012, the "sayings" in the philosophical theme song called "Maattram Ondrudhaan Maaraadhadhu" (translates to 'Change is only constant') were recited by Rajinikanth As per the director of the film, lyricist Vairamuthu and actor Rajinikanth worked on the song's lyrics for a week to avoid encountering any controversial lines. Further, as per latter's advice, couple of lines on women from the originally written lyrics were removed. This is the second time, that the actor took part in playback singing for a film after the song "Adikuthu Kuliru" in the (1992) film Mannan. Rajinikanth recited the sayings in the Hindi, the song sung by Javed Ali, for the Hindi version of the soundtrack. The lyrics were written by Irshad Kamil in Hindi and Urdu; entirely different from its Tamil counterpart. The track was recorded at AIR Studios, London on 31 March 2012. In August 2012, Sony Music Entertainment acquired the music rights of the film. In June 2013, Hollywood music engineer Geoff Foster was involved in mixing 200 tracks of orchestra for the soundtrack.

On 20 December 2012, lyricist Vairamuthu unveiled the Tamil lyrics of the melancholic song "Idhayam" (introduced as "Senthee Vizhuntha Sempor Paarayil" in 2012) through his official Twitter account. In an interview with The Hindu, he stated that it contains 2,100-year-old Tamil words in pure form with dialects of the Sangam age, planking imagery and epithets in verses. The song puts forth anguish and longing emotions and was written in 90 minutes by the lyricist. The song "Mannapenin Sathiyam" revolves around a wedding situation in the film; talks about the promise of a husband to his wife and vice versa. The track "Karma Veeran" whose lyrics focus about struggles and victory feature at the film's beginning and ending respectively. In an interview with Thamarai Extra, singer S. P. Balasubrahmanyam deciphered about the duet song "Methuvaagathaan"—the only 'commercial song' in the period drama— with singer Sadhana Sargam. At the audio listening session of the soundtrack, lyricist Vairamuthu stated that he and Rahman had shortlisted the lyrics of songs from over hundred verses, relevant in today's times, not bounded by terms of usual style, structure or syntax.

Marketing
The audio rights were acquired by Sony Music India in August 2012. On 6 March 2014 a preview event was organised by Sony Music in Chennai to selected members of the press. Four songs from the film namely "Medhuvagathaan", "Manapennin Sathiyam", "Karma Veeran" and "Maattram Onnrudhaan Maaraathadhu" were played at the event. A day prior to the music launch, audio teasers of the songs were released on MediaOne Global Entertainment's official SoundCloud channel.

The video track of "Thaandav" from the motion picture was released on 25 April 2014 as well as an online contest titled "Rajini Thandav" was held. Video teaser of "Methuvaagathaan" was released on 21 May 2014.

Release
The release of the soundtrack got pushed multiple times due to delay in film's release throughout 2012—2013. The first teaser of the film stated end of October 2013 to be the possible release date but was postponed to 12 December 2013 to coincide with Rajinikanth's birthday. A release of January 2014 was reported but the soundtrack's record label confirmed 15 February 2014 as the release date which did not materialise.

The original version, along the Telugu one of the soundtrack was released at Sathyam Cinemas, Royapettah in Chennai on 9 March 2014. The audio launch invitations printed in China involved a one-fold invite with an imposing 3D image of Rajinikanth's character in the film. The event started with a devotional song, followed by a dance tribute to Rajinikanth. The Tamil and Hindi theatrical trailers were broadcast, followed by a footage of the 'making of the film'. The event was presided by actors, Rajinikanth, Shah Rukh Khan, Deepika Padukone, Nasser, Jackie Shroff; directors K. S. Ravikumar, K. Balachander, Soundarya Rajinikanth, S. Shankar; composer A. R. Rahman, Resul Pookutty; and lyricist Vairamuthu. The full TV telecast of the audio launch and trailer release function was telecast on 30 March 2014 on Jaya TV.

Critical reception

Songs
The Tamil and Telugu versions of the soundtrack received generally positive reviews, while the Hindi version received mixed reviews.
Music Aloud rated the album 9 on a scale of 10 asserting, "Easily one of the best soundtracks that A R Rahman has produced for the Superstar!"Behindwoods gave the verdict, "Mozart of Madras' show of magnificence and mastery." They also gave it 4 out of 5 stars. Indiaglitz noted, "Given that 'Kochadaiiyaan' is a graphic entertainer, this music will well suit the screenplay, and is also a soothing album independently." They rated the album 3.7 out of 5.

Srinivas Ramanujan for The Times of India wrote, "The music of Kochadaiiyaan is more Rahman than Rajini." He gave the album 3.5 out of 5. Joginder Tuteja who reviewed the Hindi version of the soundtrack at Rediff, assigned it 3 (out of 5). He noted, "The music of Kochadaiiyaan fits in with the kind of film it is. One can't expect the kind of soundtrack that had made Sivaji and Endhiran/Robot such massive musical hits, considering that this one isn't set in current times." Bodrul Chaudhury for Bollyspice stated that he was somewhat disappointed with the music to Kochadaiiyaan, lacking in the essences of a typical A. R. Rahman album. He added, "Though ‘Vaada Vaada’ (Female Version), ‘Mera Gham’ and ‘Aaya Khwaab Ka Mausam’ are the highlights of this album, the rest of the songs were not very intriguing to listen to. Overall, this was a strenuous album to listen to and won't have a strong impact!" Sakhayan Ghosh for The Indian Express writes, "A Hindi version can never substitute the ethos of the original – conceived in a language that dictates the way lyrics, music and phonetics come together. You feel the words are fitted into a skeleton, which in turn affects the way the singer sings it, and a lot is lost in translation. Kochadaiiyaan, which is crippled by the same problem." He gave the album a score of 2.5 out of 5. At Koimoi, awarding 3.5 stars (out of 5) the critic wrote, "The drama, Kochadaiiyaan, with its warfare nuances, correctly settled for a powerful theme for the entire music album. It is an album that sports two specific trends, battle cries and anthems alongside absolute Bollywood romance." Priya Adivarekar of India's The Financial Express commented that the Kochadaiiyaan album has "its share of highs and lows, but it is definitely worth a hear!". Further, she presented the summary of the album quoting, "Kochadaiiyaan is a far cry from what we have heard in films like Sivaji: The Boss and Endhiran (Robot). Songs for both the Hindi dubbed version and the Tamil film are well-composed by A. R. Rahman, keeping in mind the theme and era in which the film is set."

Background score
The background score of the film was immensely praised by the critics. Following the popularity and positive critical response to the score, on 27 May 2014, A. R. Rahman stated that the work on compiling the motion picture's score as an album was under progress.

Critic Taran Adarsh for Bollywood Hungama wrote, "The soundtrack by A.R. Rahman is seeped in originality, but the non-popularity of songs go against them. Having said that, the powerful background score complement the visuals on screen. M. Suganth of The Times of India said, "The energetic background score compensate for the blemishes in the film" Critic Komal Nahta through is official publishing summarized, "A.R. Rahman's music is melodious but not a single song has been popularised. Lyrics are okay." Critical review board of Behindwoods praised the score, "A.R.Rahman is among the main pillars bolstering Kochadaiiyaan and he even does the honors of introducing the movie's milieu and characters in the beginning. His background score is out of the world and the work on the orchestration and instrumentation is world class. All his songs have been given pride of place but a few of them do stick out and hamper the movie's pace, particularly 'Idhayam'." Critic at Sify praised the music director by writing that his songs and BGM elevates the film to a new high. At Deccan Chronicle, Thinkal Menon stated, "AR Rahman too delivers with a quite a vibrant, commercial score" Rachit Gupta at Filmfare summarized—"Excellently crafted music by AR Rahman in the exhilarating fights and vengeance drama" Ritika Handoo of Zee News felt, "The music by AR Rahman is soothing to the ears but only time will tell whether it strikes a mass appeal or not." Critic Subhash K. Jha for Indo Asian News Service praised to score claiming, "Rahman is the film's biggest saving grace and it's his music and background score that breathes life into the film. The songs looked visually spectacular but their placement sometimes affected the film's narrative."
 At Koimoi, critic Manohar Basu gave a verdict, "A.R Rahman's background score as well as the film's music try to resurrect a lofty picture."Rajeev Masand for CNN-IBN felt, "A. R. Rahman's score is rousing."Raja Sen of Rediff said— When it is this loud, it cannot justly be called background score.

Track listing
The track listing of the original and the Telugu version was unveiled through the record label's official Twitter handle on 5 March 2014. The soundtrack consists of nine tracks.

Original version

Hindi version

Telugu version

Notes
 Jathi is a term in carnatic music that signifies the beat count of the rhythm cycle. It specifically applies to lagu component(s) of the tālam and not necessarily to the entire tālam. The different jathis are tisra (three beats in lagu), chathusra (four), khanda (five), misra (seven) and sankeerna (nine).

Chart performance
The track "Engae Pogudho Vaanam", sung by S. P. Balasubrahmanyam was released on 7 October 2013 as a single, along with its Telugu version "Choodham Aakasam Antham" to positive response; it was first aired on Radio Mirchi in Chennai the same day. Upon the soundtrack album's release on 9 March 2014, it became the first Tamil film music album to trend on Twitter and top the iTunes India charts as well as made its debut on position #3 at the Sri Lankan iTunes charts.

Audio credits
Credits adapted from original CD liner notes.

Backing vocals 

Dr. Narayanan, Nivas, Vijay Narayanan, Anand, Varun, Santosh Hariharan, Abhay Jodhpurkar, Deepak, Bhagyaraj, Parag Pooja,Malavika, Sowmya Mahadevan, Sharanya, Raagini, Veena, Gayathri

Personnel

 Indian Rhythm & Percussion – Satyanarayan, Raja, Vedachalam, Neelakantan, Lakshminarayanan, Kumar, Srinivas, Prasad
 Flute – Kiran, Naveen Iyer
 Dilruba – Saroja
 Sitar – Jarnarthan
 Veena – Devi
 Harp – Cheenu
 Shehnai – Balesh
 Trumpet – Babu
 Guitar – Prasanna
 Bass guitar – Mohini
 Timpani – Yash Pathak

Production 

Producer: A. R. Rahman
Sound Design: Resul Pookutty
Mastering: Louie Teran at Marcussen Mastering Studios, Los Angeles
Recording & Mixing: Geoff Foster at London Sessions Orchestra 
Engineers: 
Vocal supervision: Srinivas, Srinidhi Venkatesh, V.J. Srinivasamurthy, Dr. Narayan, Srinidhi Venkatesh
Music supervisor: Srinidhi Venkatesh
Project Supervisor: Suresh Permal
Chennai Strings Orchestra: V.J. Srinivasamurthy 
Additional Orchestral Arrangements: Hentry Kuruvilla
Mixing: Geoff Foster, T. R. Krishna Chetan, Tony Joy
Additional Programming: Jerry Vincent, T.R. Krishna Chetan, Hentry Kuruvilla, Marc, Ishaan Chhabra, Santhosh Dhayanithi
Music co-ordinator: Noell James, Vijay Mohan Iyer
Musicians' fixer: R. Samidurai

See also
Kochadaiiyaan
Discography of A. R. Rahman

References

External links
 Kochadaiiyaan (soundtrack) at the Internet Movie Database

A. R. Rahman soundtracks
Tamil film soundtracks
Hindi film soundtracks
2014 soundtrack albums
Sony Music India soundtracks